The 1935 Campeonato Paulista da Primeira Divisão was the 34th season of São Paulo's top association football league. Two championships were disputed that season, each by a different league.

LPF Championship

In the edition organized by the LPF (Liga Paulista de Futebol), Santos won the title for the 1st time. no teams were relegated and the top scorer was Corinthians's Teleco with 9 goals.

System
The championship was disputed in a double round-robin system, with the team with the most points winning the title.

Championship

APEA Championship

In the edition organized by the APEA (Associação Paulista de Esportes Atléticos), Portuguesa won the title for the 1st time. no teams were relegated and the top scorer was Ypiranga's Figueiredo with 19 goals.

System
The championship was disputed in a double round-robin system, with the team with the most points winning the title.

Championship

Playoffs

References

Campeonato Paulista seasons
Paulista